The Jefferson United Methodist Church is a church and historic church building located in Jefferson, Oregon, United States.

The church building was listed on the National Register of Historic Places in 1980.

See also
National Register of Historic Places listings in Marion County, Oregon

References

External links

National Register of Historic Places in Marion County, Oregon
Churches on the National Register of Historic Places in Oregon
Methodist churches in Oregon
Neoclassical architecture in Oregon
Churches completed in 1871
Churches in Marion County, Oregon
1871 establishments in Oregon
Neoclassical church buildings in the United States